The 7th Infantry Division  (7. Infanterie-Division) was a formation of the German Wehrmacht during World War II. It was formed 1 October 1934 in Munich from the Artillerieführer VII staff and renamed 7. Infanterie-Division with the disclosure of German rearmament on 15 October 1935. In preparation of the Invasion of Poland, the division was transferred to Slovak Republik on 1 August 1939. The division surrendered to Soviet forces near Stutthof after the unconditional surrender of 8 May 1945.

Commanders
Franz Halder 1 October 1934  – 12 November 1936
Otto Hartmann 12 November 1936 – 31 July 1939
Eugen Ott 1 August 1939 – 30 September 1939
Eberhardt Bohnstedt 30 September 1939 – 1 December 1939
Eccard Freiherr von Gablenz 1 December 1939 – 13 December 1941
Hans Jordan 13 December 1941 – 1 November 1942
Fritz-Georg von Rappard 1 November 1942 – 2 October 1943
Carl Andre 2 October 1943 – 30 November 1943
Gustav Gihr 30 November 1943 – 8 December 1943
Fritz-Georg von Rappard 8 December 1943
Alois Weber August 1944 – May 1945

References
Burkhard Müller-Hillebrand: Das Heer 1933–1945. Entwicklung des organisatorischen Aufbaues.  Vol.III: Der Zweifrontenkrieg. Das Heer vom Beginn des Feldzuges gegen die Sowjetunion bis zum Kriegsende. Mittler: Frankfurt am Main 1969, p. 285.
 Georg Tessin: Verbände und Truppen der  deutschen Wehrmacht und Waffen-SS im Zweiten Weltkrieg, 1939 – 1945. Vol. III: Die Landstreitkräfte 6 -14.  Mittler: Frankfurt am Main 1967.

0*007
Military units and formations established in 1934
1934 establishments in Germany
Military units and formations disestablished in 1945